Ron Finley is a former American football coach.  He was the first head football coach at Campbellsville University in Campbellsville, Kentucky, serving from 1988 to 2002 and compiling a record of 78–81–1.

Head coaching record

References

Year of birth missing (living people)
Living people
Campbellsville Tigers football coaches